Succession rights in the United Kingdom is an area of housing law concerning the ability to pass on their tenancy when they die something known as a succession.

Council properties
A council house can only have one succession unless a tenancy document grants more. If an inherited council house is too large for an individuals needs, then a tenant can also be evicted for under-occupation, although the Council would have to provide suitable alternative accommodation. The right of succession was granted by the Housing Act 1985. The Localism Act 2011 amended the succession rights of tenancies created after this date and limits them to the spouse or partner of the deceased.

Housing association properties
If you are a housing association tenant, then the right to a succession depends upon whether you are an assured tenant, assured shorthold tenant or a secure tenant.

Housing and Planning Bill
The Housing and Planning Bill proposes that secure council tenancies will be replaced by tenancies lasting between two and five years. Under the proposals family members will not inherit a lifetime tenancy.

See also
Under-occupation penalty
Assignment (housing law)

References

External links
Shelter - Can you inherit a council tenancy?

Housing in the United Kingdom
English property law